Arphaxad Charles Kole Oboth Ofumbi (July 1932 – 16 February 1977) was a Ugandan Minister, serving as Interior Minister at the time of his death in 1977. A member of the Jopadhola group, he had several children with his wife Elizabeth. His ancestral home is in Nyamalogo, Mulanda, in Tororo District.

Education 
Oboth Ofumbi was educated at Mbarara High School and Kings College Budo. He went to primary school at Kisoko Primary School.

Career 
Having worked previously as a financial assistant in the district, Oboth Ofumbi was appointed District Commissioner for Bukedi District in Eastern Uganda in 1960. By 1963, he had moved from being a district administrator in Gulu to being the assistant secretary in the Office of the Prime Minister. Under the Government of Milton Obote he was successively a chief accountant in the Defence ministry, acting Defence Minister and finally Defence Minister (1971). A good relationship with Idi Amin ensured that Oboth Ofumbi kept the role following Amin's coup in January 1971, serving as Defence Minister until 1973.

Death 
Oboth Ofumbi died while awaiting trial for his part in an alleged coup attempt. It is generally accepted that he was murdered under the orders of President Idi Amin, although the official account is of a car accident. Archbishop Janani Luwum and land minister Lt Col Erinayo Oryema were killed in the same incident. In July 2015, President Yoweri Museveni attended a service in his honour, outlining Oboth Ofumbi's apparent struggle against the Amin regime.

Authorship 
Oboth Ofumbi wrote "History & Customs of the Jopadhola" in 1960, one of the first ethnographies of the Adhola people.

Bibliography 
 Oboth-Ofumbi, A.C.K. Padhola, East African Literature Bureau, Nairobi, 1959

References 

1932 births
1977 deaths
Government ministers of Uganda
People educated at Mbarara High School